Granosolarium asperum is a species of snail. It was first described  by Richard Brinsley Hinds in 1844.

Type locality  
"contained in Indonesian part of the Makassar"

Name
Granosolarium asperum

Parent
Granosolarium Sacco, 1892

Original name
Solarium asperum Hinds, 1844

Synonymised names
Architectonica aspera (Hinds, 1844)
Claraxis illustris Iredale, 1936
Heliacus asper (Hinds, 1844)
Heliacus dilecta (Deshayes, 1863)
Mangonuia kerensis Ladd, 1982
Solarium (Torinia) admirandum Melvill & Standen, 1903
Solarium dilectum Deshayes, 1863
Torinia aspera (Hinds, 1844)

References

 Bieler, R. (1993). Architectonicidae of the Indo-Pacific (Mollusca, Gastropoda). Abhandlungen des Naturwissenschaftlichen Vereins in Hamburg. Abhandlungen des Naturwissenschaftlichen Vereins in Hamburg. NF. 30: 1-376.
 Spencer, H.G., Marshall, B.A. & Willan, R.C. (2009). Checklist of New Zealand living Mollusca. Pp 196-219. in: Gordon, D.P. (ed.) New Zealand inventory of biodiversity. Volume one. Kingdom Animalia: Radiata, Lophotrochozoa, Deuterostomia. Canterbury University Press, Christchurch
 Steyn, D.G. & Lussi, M. (1998) Marine Shells of South Africa. An Illustrated Collector's Guide to Beached Shells. Ekogilde Publishers, Hartebeespoort, South Africa, ii + 264 pp.

External links 
''This article incorporates text from http://www.marinespecies.org/aphia.php?p=taxdetails&id=585892 World Register of Marine Species
 Deshayes, G. P. (1863). Catalogue des mollusques de l'île de la Réunion (Bourbon). Pp. 1-144. In Maillard, L. (Ed.) Notes sur l'Ile de la Réunion. Dentu, Paris
 Iredale, T. (1936). Australian molluscan notes, no. 2. Records of the Australian Museum. 19(5): 267-340, pls 20-24
 Melvill, J. C. & Standen, R. (1903). Descriptions of sixty-eight new Gastropoda from the Persian Gulf, Gulf of Oman, and North Arabian Sea, dredged by the Indo-European Telegraph Service, 1901–1903. Annals and Magazine of Natural History. (7) 12: 289-324.
 Spencer H.G., Willan R.C., Marshall B.A. & Murray T.J. (2011). Checklist of the Recent Mollusca Recorded from the New Zealand Exclusive Economic Zone

Architectonicidae
Taxa named by Richard Brinsley Hinds